Dompierre-du-Chemin (Gallo: Donpièrr) is a former commune in the Ille-et-Vilaine department in Brittany in northwestern France. On 1 January 2019, it was merged into the new commune Luitré-Dompierre.

Population
Inhabitants of Dompierre-du-Chemin are called Dompierrais in French.

See also
Communes of the Ille-et-Vilaine department

References

Former communes of Ille-et-Vilaine
Populated places disestablished in 2019